Cai Yingquan (born 25 October 1966) is a Chinese former cyclist. He competed in the road race at the 1988 Summer Olympics.

References

External links
 

1966 births
Living people
Chinese male cyclists
Olympic cyclists of China
Cyclists at the 1988 Summer Olympics
Place of birth missing (living people)
20th-century Chinese people